Krosigk ist a German-language surname.

People 
 Adolf Wilhelm von Krosigk (1610-1657), German governor of Muenster
 Lutz Graf Schwerin von Krosigk (1887-1977), German jurist
 Ernst-Anton von Krosigk (1898–1945), German Army general
 Wilhelm von Krosigk (1871-1953), German Navy captain

See also 
 Cabinet Schwerin von Krosigk

German-language surnames